A Gulou is a drum tower traditionally located in the center of Chinese cities. It may also refer to:

Individual drum towers
Beijing Gulou and Zhonglou, the drum tower and bell tower of Beijing
 Drum Tower of Xi'an
 Drum Tower of Nanjing
 Bianjing Drum Tower

Administrative divisions in China

Districts
Gulou District, Fuzhou, Fujian
Gulou District, Kaifeng, Henan
Gulou District, Nanjing, Jiangsu
Gulou District, Xuzhou, Jiangsu

Subdistricts
 Gulou Subdistrict, Beijing
 Gulou Subdistrict, Ezhou, in Echeng District, Ezhou, Hubei
 Gulou Subdistrict, Macheng, in Macheng, Huanggang, Hubei

Townships
 Gulou, Anhua, Hunan Province
 Gulou, Dongkou, Dongkou County, Hunan

See also
 Gulou station (disambiguation)
 Drum Tower (disambiguation)